Anosibe Trimoloharano  is a town in Analamanga Region, in the  Central Highlands of Madagascar, located north from the capital of Antananarivo at the Ikopa River. The population was 8,275 in 2019.

References

Populated places in Analamanga